Marija Prša (born Sisak) is a Croatian volleyball player. She is a member of the Croatia women's national volleyball team and played for Volley 2002 Forlì in 2014.

Career
She was part of the Croatian national team at the 2015 FIVB World Grand Prix.

She played for Florida International University.

Clubs

References

External links
http://www.cev.lu/Competition-Area/PlayerDetails.aspx?TeamID=8614&PlayerID=41069&ID=701

1989 births
Living people
Croatian women's volleyball players
People from Sisak
FIU Panthers athletes
Expatriate volleyball players in the United States
Expatriate volleyball players in Greece
Expatriate volleyball players in Italy
Croatian expatriate volleyball players
Croatian expatriate sportspeople in the United States
Croatian expatriate sportspeople in Greece
Croatian expatriate sportspeople in Italy